Kristopher J. Chucko (born March 13, 1986) is a Canadian former ice hockey player who played two National Hockey League (NHL) games for the Calgary Flames. He was a first round selection, 24th overall, of the Flames in the 2004 NHL Entry Draft and played his entire professional career in the team's organization.  Chucko retired in 2011 as a result of concussions.

Playing career
As a youth, Chucko played in the 2000 Quebec International Pee-Wee Hockey Tournament with a minor ice hockey team from Burnaby.

Chucko was drafted after scoring 87 points in 53 games for the Salmon Arm Silverbacks of the British Columbia Hockey League. He then moved on to the University of Minnesota, where he spent two years (2004–2006).

He signed with the Flames on May 22, 2006. He was later assigned to the Flames AHL farm club, the Omaha Ak-Sar-Ben Knights, where he made his professional debut.  Chucko was recalled by the Flames on March 5, 2009, and made his NHL debut that night against the Philadelphia Flyers.  He appeared in two games total before being returned to Omaha.  He remained in the Flames system in 2009–10, joining the team's new AHL affiliate, the Abbotsford Heat. His season was ended just after Christmas when he suffered a severe concussion during a game. The Flames re-signed Chucko to a one-year contract for the 2010-11 season.

Chucko suffered another serious concussion in October 2010, exacerbating a neck injury and limiting him to just two games for the Heat in 2010–11.  Following the season, he made the decision to retire as a player.

Career statistics

References

External links

1986 births
Living people
Abbotsford Heat players
Calgary Flames draft picks
Calgary Flames players
Canadian ice hockey right wingers
Sportspeople from Burnaby
Minnesota Golden Gophers men's ice hockey players
National Hockey League first-round draft picks
Omaha Ak-Sar-Ben Knights players
Quad City Flames players
Ice hockey people from British Columbia